Bialik Hebrew Day School is a private, Jewish day school located in Toronto, Ontario, Canada. It is one of the few day schools in Toronto's Board of Jewish Education to teach Yiddish, beginning in grade three.

History
Bialik Hebrew Day School was established in 1961 with 54 students and four staff members by members of the Labour Zionist movement, with Moishe Mendachovsky as its first principal. By 1975, enrolment had increased to 550 students and 52 staff. 
The school was named in honour of the poet Chaim Nachman Bialik. It has four "houses" named after Israeli universities: Bar-Ilan/Tel-Aviv, Ben-Gurion/Weizmann, Hebrew University, and Haifa/Technion.

References

External links

1961 establishments in Ontario
Educational institutions established in 1961
Elementary schools in Toronto
Jewish Canadian history
Jewish day schools
Private schools in Toronto
Jewish schools in Canada